David H. Moriarty (August 19, 1911 – September 16, 1989)  was an American sound engineer. He was nominated for an Academy Award in the category Best Sound for the film Airport.

Selected filmography
 Airport (1970; co-nominated with Ronald Pierce)

References

External links

1911 births
1989 deaths
American audio engineers
People from Nebraska
20th-century American engineers